Chlorostrymon kuscheli is a butterfly of the family Lycaenidae. It was described by Emilio Ureta Rojas in 1949. It is found in northern Tarapaca, Chile.

References

 "Chlorostrymon kuscheli (Ureta, 1949)". Insecta.pro.

Butterflies described in 1949
Eumaeini
Endemic fauna of Chile